The giant catfish (Netuma thalassina), also known as the giant sea catfish, giant salmon catfish, giant marine-catfish, or the khagga, is a species of catfish in the family Ariidae. It was described by Eduard Rüppell in 1837, originally under the genus Bagrus. It inhabits estuaries and occasionally freshwater bodies, in Japan, Australia, Polynesia, southern Vietnam in the Mekong Delta, the Red Sea and the northwestern Indian Ocean.

The diet of the giant catfish includes crustaceans such as crabs, shrimp, prawns and stomatopods; worms, finfish, cephalopods, sea cucumbers, and mollusks. It spawns between April and August.

The giant catfish is harvested commercially and recreationally.

References

Ariidae
Fish described in 1837